Kakar's racerunner (Eremias kakari) is a species of lizard found in Pakistan.

References

Eremias
Reptiles described in 2020